Maheswar Naik is an Indian politician. He was elected to the Lok Sabha, the lower house of the Parliament of India as a member of the Indian National Congress .

References

External links
Official biographical sketch in Parliament of India website

1906 births
Lok Sabha members from Odisha
Rajya Sabha members from Odisha
India MPs 1962–1967
Year of death missing
Indian National Congress politicians from Odisha